The 2000 Walsall Metropolitan Borough Council election took place on 4 May 2000 to elect members of Walsall Metropolitan Borough Council in the West Midlands, England. One third of the council was up for election and  the Labour party lost overall control of the council to no overall control.

After the election, the composition of the council was
Labour 27
Conservative 26
Liberal Democrat 7

Election result

References

2000 English local elections
2000
2000s in the West Midlands (county)